Thou Art the Man is a 1920 American silent drama film produced by Famous Players-Lasky and released through Paramount Pictures. Thomas N. Heffron directed the film which starred stage and matinee idol Robert Warwick and Lois Wilson. It is based on a novel, Myles Calthorpe, I.D.B. by F. E. Mills Young, with a screenplay by Margaret Turnbull.

This is considered to be a lost film.

Plot
Based upon a description in a film publication, Myles Calthrope (Warwick) is an English soldier of fortune who drifts into the diamond mining fields of South Africa and finds employment with some diamond smugglers who masquerade as feather merchants. When he comes to suspect their true business, Myles is dismissed. He then goes to Cape Town where he falls in love with Joan Farrant (Wilson). She helps him to get a job with her brother, who is also secretly a smuggler. The police arrest Myles in an illicit enterprise of which he has no knowledge, and he goes to prison for three years. Eventually the real criminals are arrested, and Myles finds happiness with Joan.

Cast
Robert Warwick as Myles Calthrope
Lois Wilson as Joan Farrant
J. M. Dumont as Henry Farrant
Clarence Burton as Matt Solomon
Clarence Geldart as George Brummage (billed as Charles H. Geldert)
Harry Carter as Mr. Prescott
Viora Daniel as Fannie Dering
Lorenza Lazzarini as Lucille
Lillian Leighton as Cook
Sylvia Ashton as Chaperone
Joan Marsh as Ellie Prescott (billed as Dorothy Rosher)
Richard Wayne as Tom Dering
Jane Wolfe as Mrs. Prescott

References

External links

synopsis at AllMovie
Lobby poster of Robert Warwick in Thou Art the Man
Two stills from the film with Robert Warwick and Lois Wilson: #1 and #2

1920 films
American silent feature films
Lost American films
Films based on British novels
American black-and-white films
Films directed by Thomas N. Heffron
Silent American drama films
1920 drama films
1920 lost films
Lost drama films
1920s American films